Centurion Transport Engineering was an Australian bus bodybuilder in Upfield, Melbourne.

History
Centurion Transport Engineering originally built specialist bodies for transport disabled passengers. In 1980 it began bodying route buses. Originally based in Sunshine it later relocated to Upfield. It bodied over 400 buses including many for the Australian Defence Forces and 4x4 Unimogs for AAT Kings. Centurion ceased operations in 1990.

References

External links
Bus Australia gallery

Bus manufacturers of Australia
Australian companies disestablished in 1990